Badsha the King is a 2004 Bengali film directed by Saurav Chakraborty and produced by Suman Kumar Das under the banner of Burima Chitram. The film features actors Prosenjit Chatterjee and Koel Mallick in the lead roles. The film was scored by Ashok Bhadra and Snehasish Chakraborty.

Cast 
 Prosenjit Chatterjee as Badsha
 Koel Mallick as Titli, Badsha's love interest
Mrinal Mukherjee as Sushovan Dutta
 Laboni Sarkar as Manimala, Titli's mother
 Dulal Lahiri
 Subhasish Mukhopadhyay
 Anamika Saha
 Rajesh Sharma as Shaktinath, Titli's maternal uncle
 Locket Chatterjee
 Shantilal Mukherjee

Soundtrack 

Ashok Bhadra and  Snehasish Chakraborty composed the film score of Badsha The King. Babul Supriyo, Kumar Sanu, Udit Narayan, Deepmala & Sadhana Sargam sung all the songs of this film.

Track listing

External links

References 

2004 films
2000s Bengali-language films
Bengali-language Indian films